The Calgary Roughnecks are a lacrosse team based in Calgary playing in the National Lacrosse League (NLL). The 2018 season is the 17th in franchise history.

Final standings

Game log

Regular season

Playoffs

Roster

Entry Draft
The 2017 NLL Entry Draft took place on September 18, 2017. The Roughnecks made the following selections:

See also
2018 NLL season

References

Calgary
Calgary Roughnecks seasons
Calgary Roughnecks